The Works and Hydraulics Industrial Workers Union was a trade union in Trinidad and Tobago that merged in 1957 with the Government Farm and Nursery Workers Trade Union and the Industrial and Railway Employees Trade Union to form the National Union of Government Employees

See also

 List of trade unions
 Federated Workers Trade Union
 National Union of Government and Federated Workers

References

Defunct trade unions of Trinidad and Tobago